Hina-au-kekele (also known as Hina-au-aku, Hinauapu or simply Hina) was a Hawaiian noble lady and Chiefess of the Island of Hawaii (Big Island). She was the sister-wife of the High Chief Pilikaaiea of Hawaii, and they were the founders of the dynasty named Pili line (Hawaiian: Hale o Pili).

Biography 
Hina was born on Tahiti as the daughter of Hawaiian nobleman Laau and his sister-wife, the noble lady called Kukamolimaulialoha (Kukamolimolialoha). It is unknown why her father and mother went to Tahiti. Hina's grandfather was the High Chief Lanakawai of Hawaii (a descendant of Ulu). Hina was named after the goddess Hina. 

The brother of Hina was Pilikaʻaiea, who is often simply known as Pili. They were married, and their sexual union was considered sacred, according to the Hawaiian customs and laws. Their children were:
Koa (Ko) — a son
Hinaʻauamai — a daughter (also named after Hina) and the wife of her brother

Hina and Pilikaaiea came to Hawaii together with the wizard Paʻao, and Pilikaʻaiea became a successor of Kapawa. Pilikaʻaiea and Hina were the ancestors of Pilikaaieaʻs successor, Chief Kukohou (died 1185).

See also 
Hina (chiefess)
Hina (goddess)

References

Tahitian women
House of Pili
Hawaiian chiefesses